Alton White (born May 31, 1945) is a Canadian former professional ice hockey player. He played three seasons in the World Hockey Association with the New York Raiders, Los Angeles Sharks, and the Michigan Stags/Baltimore Blades.

Born in Amherst, Nova Scotia, White is best known for being the second player of African descent, after Willie O'Ree, to have played on a professional major league ice hockey team and for being the first hockey player of African descent to score 20 goals in a single season for a major league team. He scored 21 goals and 21 assists for the Los Angeles Sharks during the 1972-73 season. During the same 1972-73 season, he became the first black player in history to score a hat-trick in a major league professional game, doing so against the Chicago Cougars.

References

External links 
 

1945 births
Baltimore Blades players
Black Canadian ice hockey players
Canadian ice hockey forwards
Greensboro Generals (SHL) players
Ice hockey people from Nova Scotia
Living people
Los Angeles Sharks players
Michigan Stags players
New York Raiders players
Black Nova Scotians
People from Amherst, Nova Scotia